Coalburn is a village in South Lanarkshire, Scotland, UK. It is located near the villages of Auchlochan, Bankend and Braehead.

History
The opencast mine that opened in the village in the late 1980s became the biggest mine in Europe by the early 1990s.

In 2010 the population was 1267.

Coalburn is twinned with Feuchtwangen in Germany and Fanny Bay in Canada.

Education 
Coalburn Primary is a primary school in Coalburn. Their affiliated high school Lesmahagow High School is in the neighbouring town of Lesmahagow.

See also 
 Auchlochan Collieries
 Coalburn railway station

References

Villages in South Lanarkshire
Mining communities in Scotland